The Casablanca International Book Fair is an annual book fair held in Casablanca, Morocco.  

It is the largest book fair in Morocco, and one of the most significant annual events in Moroccan literature. It is held for over ten days every February, under the patronage of King Muhammad VI. The Moroccan Ministry of Culture organizes the fair in conjunction with the Moroccan Agency for Development, Investment, and Export, and the Office of Fairs and Expositions. 

The book fair covers a surface area of 20,000 m², making it one of Morocco's largest cultural events. It attracts a number of cultural organizations and actors, including foreign missions, religious organizations, authors, artists, and publishers, in addition to visitors of all ages and backgrounds.

Activities and cultural program 
Each year, approximately 700 publishing houses from 44 different countries, specializing in various fields of knowledge, participate in the book fair, in addition to cultural organizations, research centers, universities, and non-profit organizations.

The National Reading Award is presented during the book fair.

Children's wing 
In every year of the book fair, there is a wing reserved for publishing houses dedicated to children's books. The event aims to promote literacy among Moroccan children through a number of initiatives designed to encourage reading among children.

Guests of honor

Awards presented 

 Prize of Morocco for Literature
 Prize of Morocco for Human Sciences
 Prize of Morocco for Social Sciences
 Prize of Morocco for Literary, Artistic, and Linguistic Studies
 Prize of Morocco for Translation

References 

Book fairs in Morocco
Casablanca
Literary festivals in Morocco